Zaniza Zapotec (Zapoteco de Santa María Zaniza) is an Oto-Manguean language of western Oaxaca, Mexico. It is one of several Zapotec languages called Papabuco. It has only 10% intelligibility with Texmelucan Zapotec, its closest important relative. (Speakers of the nearly extinct Elotepec Zapotec have 70% understanding of Zaniza, but it is not known if the reverse is true, so this may be a question of familiarity.)

The language is spoken in Santa María Zaniza, Oaxaca. As of 2003, the language had about 400 fluent speakers. It is also spoken in Santiago Textitlán.

Phonology 

Zaniza Zapotec has five vowels /i, e, a, o, u/, phonemic vowel nasalization, and a distinction between modal and laryngealized vowels.

Tone 
Zaniza Zapotec words contrast low, mid, and high tones on stressed syllables. Unstressed syllables, apart from a few pronominal enclitics, do not bear contrastive tone.

References

External links 

OLAC resources in and about the Zaniza Zapotec language

Zapotec languages